Tomislav Bilic (born 1 September 1997) is an Australia professional footballer who lasted played as a goalkeeper for the Brisbane Roar FC.

Brisbane Roar
He made his professional debut for Brisbane Roar during the 2017 AFC Champions League on 26 April 2017 in a match against Thai club Muangthong United F.C.

References

External links

1997 births
Living people
Association football goalkeepers
Australian soccer players
Brisbane Roar FC players
National Premier Leagues players